Licantén is a town within the Licantén commune, administered by the Municipality of Licantén within the Curicó Province in the Maule Region of Chile. The commune also include the coastal town of Iloca.

Demographics
Of these, 3,974 (57.6%) lived in urban areas and 2,928 (42.4%) in rural areas. The population grew by 8.8% (557 persons) between the 1992 and 2002 censuses.

Administration
As a commune, Licantén is a third-level administrative division of Chile administered by a municipal council, headed by an alcalde who is directly elected every four years. The 2008-2012 alcalde is Héctor Quiero Palacios (UDI).

Within the electoral divisions of Chile, Licantén is represented in the Chamber of Deputies by Roberto León (PDC) and Celso Morales (UDI) as part of the 36th electoral district, together with Curicó, Teno, Romeral, Molina, Sagrada Familia, Hualañé, Vichuquén and Rauco. The commune is represented in the Senate by Juan Antonio Coloma Correa (UDI) and Andrés Zaldívar Larraín (PDC) as part of the 10th senatorial constituency (Maule-North).

See also
 Chilean Wine Palm

References

External links
  Municipality of Licantén

Populated places in Curicó Province
Communes of Chile